An air-launched cruise missile (ALCM) is a cruise missile that is launched from a military aircraft. Current versions are typically standoff weapons which are used to attack predetermined land targets with conventional, nuclear or thermonuclear payloads. 

Specific types of ALCMs (current, past and under development) include:

AGM-28 Hound Dog (USA)
AGM-84H/K SLAM-ER (USA)
AGM-86 ALCM (USA)
AGM-129 ACM (USA)
AGM-158 JASSM (USA)
AGM-158C LRASM (USA)
Air-Sol Moyenne Portée ASMP (France)
ASN4G (France)
BrahMos (India/Russia)
BrahMos-NG (India)
BrahMos-II (India/Russia)
CJ-10 (China)
Delilah (Israel)
Hatf-VIII (Ra'ad) (Pakistan)
Hypersonic Attack Cruise Missile USA
Ra'ad-II (Pakistan)
Joint Strike Missile (Norway/USA)
Kalibr-A (Russia)
KEPD 350 (Germany/Sweden)
Kh-20 (USSR)
Kh-32 (Russia)
Kh-35 (Russia)
Kh-55/Kh-555 (USSR/Russia)
Kh-59 (USSR/Russia)
Kh-61 (USSR/Russia)
Kh-101/102 (Russia)
KSR-5 (USSR)
LRSO (Long Range Stand Off Weapon) (USA)
MICLA-BR (Brazil)
Perseus (France/UK)
Popeye (Israel)
Saber (UAE)
SOM (Turkey)
Soumar (Iran)
Storm Shadow (France/UK)
Ya-Ali (Iran)
3M-51 Alfa (Russia)
3M22 Zircon (Russia)
10Kh (USSR)
Wan Chien (Taiwan)

See also
Air-launched ballistic missile
Air-to-surface missile

References

Air-launched cruise missiles